Reus Futbol Club Reddis is a Spanish football team based in Reus, in Catalonia.

History
The team was founded in 1922 under the name FC Catalunya, later in the 1930s it would change its name to Catalunya Nova. At the end of the Spanish civil war, the club underwent a name change again and was renamed CD Nacional, finally in 1941 it adopted the name Club de Fútbol Reddis, with which it is known.

During most of its history, CF Reddis was the second most important club in the city of Reus, due to the prominence of CF Reus Deportiu. Since while Reus Deportiu played national competitions such as Segunda División B and Tercera División, Reddis remained in the regional categories of Catalan football, even for some years Reddis functioned as a reserve team for Reus Deportiu.

In 2018 a financial crisis began for Reus Deportiu, finally the team was liquidated in October 2020 after not being able to settle its debts, so CF Reddis became the main team in the city.

During 2021, conversations began between CF Reddis and the youth football branch of CF Reus Deportiu for the creation of a unique club project. Finally, in the summer of 2022, the Reddis members' assembly approved the proposal and the team was renamed Reus FC Reddis. In addition, the team began to use the colors red and black as the main colors, leaving the traditional white and blue. The team also went on to occupy the Estadi Municipal de Reus.

Season to season

References

External links
Official website 
Futbol Regional team profile 

Football clubs in Catalonia
Association football clubs established in 1922
Divisiones Regionales de Fútbol clubs
1922 establishments in Spain